Bachia peruana, the Peru bachia, is a species of lizard in the family Gymnophthalmidae. It is found in Peru and Brazil.

References

Bachia
Reptiles described in 1901
Taxa named by Franz Werner